Zinc finger FYVE domain-containing protein 19 is a protein that in humans is encoded by the ZFYVE19 gene.

References

Further reading